Wayne B. Wheeler Jr. (born March 28, 1950) is a former American football wide receiver who played for the Chicago Bears in the National Football League (NFL). He played college football at the University of Alabama. He also played for the Birmingham Vulcans of the World Football League.

Early life and education

High school
Wheeler attended and played high school football at William R. Boone High School. He was a running back as a sophomore. Then, later on, got shifted to being a wide receiver.

College
Wheeler attended and played college football at The University of Alabama from 1971–1973. When he was a junior, he broke David Bailey's 'wishbone receiving record'. In his collegiate career, he had 55 receptions for 1246 yards and 11 receiving touchdowns.

Professional career

Chicago Bears
Wheeler was drafted by the Chicago Bears in the 3rd round of the 1974 NFL draft. In week 13 of his rookie season, he caught a 19-yard pass for a touchdown against the San Diego Chargers. This was his first and only season in the NFL, playing 12 games and missing 2 games due to sickness and injuries, including a broken foot during the pre-season.

Birmingham Vulcans
After the 1974 NFL season, Wheeler moved on to the newly-formed World Football League, signing with the Vulcans for the 1975 season. He was cut from the team on October 8, 1975, after playing 3 games. He still recorded 3 receptions for 57 yards with his longest reception being 24 yards.

Tampa Bay Buccaneers
Wheeler was invited to the Tampa Bay Buccaneers training camp in the 1976 NFL off-season. He played a pre-season game against the Los Angeles Rams on July 31, 1976. However, he did not make the team. That marked the end of his career.

See also
 Alabama Crimson Tide football yearly statistical leaders

References 

1950 births
Living people
Players of American football from Orlando, Florida
American football wide receivers
William R. Boone High School alumni
Alabama Crimson Tide football players
Chicago Bears players
Birmingham Vulcans players
Tampa Bay Buccaneers players